Mudboils are volcano-like cones of fine sand and silt that range from several inches to several feet high and from several inches to more than 30 feet in diameter. Active mudboils are dynamic ebb-and-flow features that can erupt and form a large cone in several days, then cease flowing, or they may discharge continuously for several years. They have been observed in the Tully Valley in Onondaga County, in central New York State, since the late 1890s.

See also 
 Mudpot
 Frost boils, also sometimes known as mud boils

References 

Volcanic landforms
Geothermal areas in the United States